Saint-Georges-du-Bois may refer to the following places in France:

 Saint-Georges-du-Bois, Charente-Maritime, a commune in the Charente-Maritime department
 Saint-Georges-du-Bois, Maine-et-Loire, a commune in the Maine-et-Loire department
 Saint-Georges-du-Bois, Sarthe, a commune in the Sarthe department